Founders of the European Union may refer to:

Founding fathers of the European Union

Founding members of the European Union